Mývatn Airport  is an airport serving Reykjahlíð, Iceland.

The Lake Mývatn area is a nature preserve of volcanic origin.

Statistics

Passengers and movements

See also 
 Transport in Iceland
 List of airports in Iceland

Notes

References 

 Google Earth

External links 
 OurAirports - Reykjahlíð
 Mývatn Airport
 OpenStreetMap - Reykjahlíð

Airports in Iceland